Roland Napoléon Bonaparte, 6th Prince of Canino and Musignano (19 May 1858 – 14 April 1924) was a French prince and president of the Société de Géographie from 1910 until his death. He was the last male-lineage descendant of Lucien Bonaparte, the genetically senior branch of the family since 1844.

Biography
Bonaparte was born in Paris on 19 May 1858, the son of Prince Pierre Napoleon Bonaparte and Éléonore-Justine Ruflin. He was a grandson of Lucien Bonaparte, Emperor Napoleon I's brother.

Prince Roland was married in Paris on 18 November 1880, to Marie-Félix Blanc (1859–1882), the daughter of François Blanc. They had one daughter, Marie Bonaparte (1882–1962).

In 1884, Bonaparte was part of a scientific expedition that photographed and anatomically measured the Sami inhabitants of Northern Norway. The following year he was photographing Aboriginal Australians brought to Europe and the US to be studied by anthropologists and exhibited by the general public.

Bonaparte was the President of the Société astronomique de France (SAF), the French astronomical society, from 1921–1923.

On the death of his cousin Prince Napoléon Charles Bonaparte in 1899, he succeeded him as the 6th Prince of Canino and Musignano, but he never assumed the title. With Prince Roland's death in Paris on 14 April 1924, the senior line of the House of Bonaparte descending from Lucien Bonaparte became extinct in the male line.

Legacy
Bonaparte Point in Antarctica was named after him by Jean-Baptiste Charcot. There is also a small lake on the mountains above the Coast Sámi/Norwegian village Kvalsund which is called Bonapartesjøen - Lake Bonaparte - after his abovementioned visit to the region.

References

External links

Presidents of the Société de Géographie

1858 births
1924 deaths
Nobility from Paris
Roland Bonaparte
Roland Bonaparte
Roland Bonaparte
French geographers
Presidents of the International Geographical Union
Members of the French Academy of Sciences